Point of Graves Burial Ground is a small historic cemetery in Portsmouth, New Hampshire, dating to the 17th century. It was the final resting place for many of Portsmouth's prominent residents including the Wentworth family, the Vaughan family, the Rogers, and the Lears. It is the oldest known surviving cemetery in Portsmouth, and one of the oldest in the state. It has about 125 gravestones. Previously neglected, it is now well maintained by the Mayor's Committee and the city. The cemetery plot was on a point of land that directly overlooked the Piscataqua River in earlier times.

History

Captain John Pickering II agreed to let the town have half an acre "upon the neck of land on which he liveth, where the people have been wont to be buried, which land shall be impropriated forever unto the use of a burying place." The earliest legible gravestone is dated 1682. 

There are ghost stories related about the cemetery. Putative hauntings are part of tourist appeal.

It is believed that the area was used as a cemetery prior to its formal dedication. However, because Pickering retained use of the site for cattle grazing, many earlier stones were destroyed or damaged.

The cemetery has many fine examples of gravestone carvings by talented and noted New England carvers. Because of its extended use, there are many examples illustrating the fashionable evolution of headstone symbolism, iconography, imagery and monumental inscription.

Elizabeth Elatson (d. 1704–05), a house fire victim, is buried there. The report in The Boston News-Letter was the first published account of a house fire in America.

It is one of six cemeteries owned and maintained by the City of Portsmouth, which is working under a comprehensive maintenance and restoration program. It is supported via the Historic Cemeteries Trust Fund.

Location
It is located on the south side of Mechanic Street opposite Prescott Park, between Marcy Street and the Peirce Island Bridge. The area around it was once a center of coastal trade and warehouses.

Tours of the graveyard are offered by local author Roxie Zwicker.  Yankee Magazine named it to the top five "best cemetery tours in New England" in 2017.  That evaluation seems to depend both on the cemetery, and the identity of the knowledgeable and amusing docent, who opines that "cemeteries are art museums," is paired with a claimed spectral sidekick, and has visited over 400 New England burial grounds.

See also
John Paul Jones House

References

Notes

Citations

Bibliography

External links
A Very Grave Matter, online tomb-by-tomb information
Point of Graves Burial Ground at Find a Grave

Cemeteries in New Hampshire
Buildings and structures in Portsmouth, New Hampshire
Cemeteries established in the 17th century
17th-century establishments in the Thirteen Colonies